Siberian Express is a meteorological term in the United States.

Siberian Express may also refer to:
 Trans-Siberian Railway express train
 Siberian Express (horse), a racehorse
 Alexei Cherepanov (1989–2008), Russian hockey player
 Ivan Drago, a fictional character in the 1985 film Rocky IV
 Nikolay Sazhin (born 1988), Russian chess boxer
 Siberian Express (album), an album by jazz guitarist David Becker